Metikurke Ramaswamy Kamala (Kannada: ಎಂ.ಆರ್.ಕಮಲ) is an Indian Kannada language author, poet, and translator.

Early life and education 
Kamala was born in Metikurke, a village in Hassan district of Karnataka. Her parents, N H Raamaswamy and Vishaalakshi, had a farm, and she was the second youngest of 11 siblings. Her father, who was a gamaka performer, encouraged her interest in literature. 

Kamala's early education was in the nearby school in her hometown. She moved to Bangalore after her SSLC examinations, receiving a BA degree from MES college. She studied Kannada at Bangalore University, receiving a MA in 1980, as well as a Bachelor of Laws degree.

Career 
Kamala began writing poems and stories at an early age, and when she was at college, some of them were published in college magazines. She also had a few stories published in the Sunday edition of the newspaper Prajavani. Her first poetry collection, Shakuntalopakhyana was published in 1988. 

Many of her poems have been translated into other languages, including English, Bengali, Gujarati, Malayalam, Telugu and Marathi, and in 2005, some of them were set to music by composer C. Ashwath.

She has also worked as a translator, translating books from various languages into Kannada. She has primarily focused on translating works written by women, including African, Arab, and African-American female writers. Her translation of Maya Angelou's autobiography I Know Why the Caged Bird Sings 

She started her academic career working as a Kannada Lecturer in a government college, at Halebidu in 1981. She retired as principal of Shivanahalli Government Pre University College, Rajajinagar, Bengaluru in 2018.

Bibliography 

 Shakuntalopakhyana (1988)
 Kattala Hoovina Haadu (1989)
 Jaane Mattu Itara KavitegaLu (1992)
 Jivananandara Kavitegalu (2003)
 Hoovu Chellida Haadi (2007)
 Nettarali Nenda Chandra (2016)
 Maaribidi (2017)
 Oora Beediya Suttu (2020)
 Gadyagandhi (2020)
 Quarantine (2020)
 Kappu Hakkiya Belakina Haadu
 Rosa Parks
 Sere Hakki Haduvudu Ekendu Balle

Awards and recognitions 
 Karnataka Sahitya Academy Award
 Translation Academy award
 Kuvempu Bhasha Bharathi Award (2007)
 SV Parameshwara Bhat award (2017)
 Maasti award (2018)
 BM Shri Golden Medal winner
 Muddanna poetry award
 Amma Award instituted by the Matrushree Mahadevamma Nagappa Munnur Prathishtan
 Matrushri Ratnamma Hedge Memorial Award

References

Kannada-language writers
Living people
1959 births